The Triple Crown is a term in European professional club basketball that refers to a club winning their country's top-tier level national domestic league, primary national domestic cup, and the top-tier level European-wide continental competition (EuroLeague) in the same season. It is the highest accomplishment that a European basketball club can achieve during a season. Only 12 European basketball clubs have achieved the Triple Crown, on 22 occasions.

All the Triple Crowns achieved

In the 2000–01 season, there were two first-tier level European-wide champions: Maccabi Tel Aviv, that won FIBA's SuproLeague and Kinder Bologna, that won Euroleague Basketball Company's EuroLeague.
Šarūnas Jasikevičius is the only player in the history of European basketball to have won the Triple Crown with his teams 4 times. The teams that won the Triple Crown in which Jasikevičius played are: FC Barcelona in 2002–03, Maccabi Tel Aviv in 2003–04 and 2004–05, and Panathinaikos in 2008–09.

Achievements by club

Achievements by national league

"Small Triple Crown"

Second-tiers
In addition, five European basketball clubs have won their top-tier level national domestic league, their top-tier level national domestic cup, and the 2nd-tier level European-wide competition (FIBA European Cup Winner's Cup / FIBA European Cup, or EuroCup) in the same season – the so-called, "Small Triple Crown".

Third and fourth-tiers
Seven clubs, on eight occasions, have won their top-tier level national domestic league, their top-tier level national domestic cup, and the 3rd-tier level European-wide competition (FIBA Korać Cup or FIBA EuroChallenge), or the 4th-tier level FIBA EuroCup Challenge / FIBA Europe Cup, in the same season.

EuroLeague awards and honors
Basketball statistics